The following is a list of the 698 communes of the Côte-d'Or department of France.

The communes cooperate in the following intercommunalities (as of 2020):
Dijon Métropole
Communauté d'agglomération Beaune Côte et Sud (partly)
Communauté de communes Auxonne Pontailler Val de Saône
Communauté de communes Forêts, Seine et Suzon
Communauté de communes de Gevrey-Chambertin et de Nuits-Saint-Georges
Communauté de communes Mirebellois et Fontenois
Communauté de communes du Montbardois
Communauté de communes Norge et Tille
Communauté de communes Ouche et Montagne
Communauté de communes du Pays Arnay Liernais
Communauté de communes du Pays Châtillonnais
Communauté de communes du Pays d'Alésia et de la Seine
Communauté de communes de la Plaine Dijonnaise
Communauté de communes de Pouilly-en-Auxois et Bligny-sur-Ouche
Communauté de communes Rives de Saône
Communauté de communes de Saulieu
Communauté de communes des Terres d'Auxois
Communauté de communes Tille et Venelle
Communauté de communes des Vallées de la Tille et de l'Ignon

See also
 Lists of communes of France
 Administrative divisions of France

References

Cote-d'or